Fadhel Abbas (born 3 June 1951) is a former Iraqi football goalkeeper who played for Iraq in the 1974 Asian Games. He played for Iraq from 1974 to 1975.

References

Iraqi footballers
Iraq international footballers
Footballers at the 1974 Asian Games
Association football goalkeepers
1951 births
Living people
Asian Games competitors for Iraq